Lasmanis is a Latvian surname, its  female form is Lasmane. Notable people with the surname include:

Kārlis Lasmanis (born 1994), Latvian basketball player
Uģis Lasmanis (born 1967), Latvian rower
Lidija Doroņina-Lasmane (born 1925), Latvian dissident

Latvian-language masculine surnames